Gayatri Rema is an Indian actress who has appeared in Tamil language films. After portraying her first major lead role in Touring Talkies (2015), she appeared in the Tamil films Oruthal  (2016) and Saaya (2017).

Career
Gayatri Rema made her acting debut in the anthology film Touring Talkies (2015), after being recommended by the film's lead actor S. A. Chandrasekhar. Appearing as a young girl in a "modern" relationship, the film had music composed by Ilaiyaraaja, but the film did not perform well at the box office. Gayatri later appeared in another small budget film Oruthal, which received media attention after actor Jai Akash bought the distribution rights.

In 2017, Gayatri Rema featured as a village girl in the horror film Saaya directed and produced by Pazhanivel. The film, which featured her alongside Santhosh Khanna and Sonia Agarwal, had a relatively low profile release in February 2017. Her next release will be Villangam opposite actor Nandha, with Gayatri replacing actress Meenakshi midway through production.

Filmography

Films

Web series

References

External links 

Indian film actresses
Actresses in Tamil cinema
Living people
Year of birth missing (living people)